Netball in Wales is organised by the Welsh Netball Association.  Copies of the rule book were sold in Wales by 1903.  Marion Morton was involved with early organising of the game in Wales. Between 1949 and 1976, the Wales national team lost to England on twenty-eight occasions.

Governance
The Welsh Netball Association (Cymdeithas Pêl Rwyd Cymru) was created in 1945. The WNA is responsible for national championships, Welsh squad selection, international matches, the training and development of players, coaches and umpires and for the Sport Wales National Centre Netball Academy, Cardiff. The Welsh Netball Association is based in Pontcanna, Cardiff.

History
In the period between 1902 and 1925, copies of the netball rule book published by the Ling Association of England were sold in Wales. Marion Morton was involved in organizing netball in South Wales during the late 1930s.  She was based out of the Mary Datchelor School.  Marion Morton helped work towards the formation of the Welsh Netball Association. During and preceding the 1970s, most of the world, outside of New Zealand and Australia, played a one handed variety of netball.  This allowed a more fluid type of game, with longer passes designed to open up the court. Like other national associations, the Welsh have created a modified version of the game for children called 'Dragon Netball'. It is geared for seven- to eleven-year-olds. Male participation in netball in Wales has been increasing in the past several years.

National team
Wales's record against England in international matched between 1949 and 1976 was zero wins and twenty-eight losses. In 1949, England played its first real international matches against Scotland and Wales.  Wales played England on 7 May at the GEG Grounds.  Wales lost by a score of 25–3. In 1951, Wales again played England, this time at Cardiff.  The Welsh lost 26–7. In 1955, there was a United Kingdom netball championship held in Harringay Arena.  Several thousand people attended the event.  Wales lost their game against England.  The series is notable because the games were played indoors for the first time. In 1973, the International Schools' Tournament was held for the first time.  Wales again lost to England. In 2011, the Welsh national team was ranked 9th.

References

Bibliography